Steak Escape is a restaurant chain based in Columbus, Ohio, United States. Locations are typically found in food courts in shopping malls as well as airports, all serving a variety of menu items, including cheesesteaks. The company is known as the originator of the mall cheesesteak concept. The chain is owned by Columbus, Ohio-based Escape Enterprises.

History
The company was founded in Columbus, Ohio in 1982. In 1983, parent company Escape Enterprises Limited was formed, and the company began franchising.

By 1997, the company revenue was US$55.8M.

In September 1998, the chain secured US$35M in franchise funding from financing Franchise Mortgage Acceptance Co. of East Brunswick, N.J.

In 2004, Steak Escape began to open co-locations with Taco John's.

In 2014, a Steak Escape store was opened in Karachi, Pakistan.

Locations
As of 2015, the company operated restaurants in over 100 cities in 23 states and seven countries, including Lebanon, Singapore, the UAE, and Russia.

See also
 List of submarine sandwich restaurants

References

External links
 Official website

Companies based in the Columbus, Ohio metropolitan area
Submarine sandwich restaurants
Fast-food chains of the United States
1982 establishments in Ohio
Restaurants in Ohio
Restaurants established in 1982